Johnny Jump Up can refer to:

 A number of species of violet (Viola sp.) flower, including:
 Viola bicolor, also known as the American field pansy
 Viola cornuta, also known as the tufted pansy
 Viola pedunculata also known as the California golden violet
 Viola tricolor, also known as heartsease
 A local name for the blue-black grassquit bird
 Johnny Jump Up (song), an Irish folk song about strong cider